is a purpose built municipal art gallery in Nada-ku, Kobe, Hyōgo Prefecture, Japan. It was opened in 2002.

The major collections of the museum are foreign and Japanese sculptures, foreign and Japanese prints, Western-style and Japanese-style paintings associated with Hyogo Prefecture, Japanese greatworks in modern era, and contemporary art.

This museum has memorial rooms of Ryōhei Koiso and Kanayama Heizō. They are two of the  greatest contemporary artists in Japan.

The building of the museum is a modern, concrete construction by famed architect Tadao Ando.

References
Official Home Page of Hyōgo Prefectural Museum of Art

Tadao Ando buildings
Art museums and galleries in Kobe
Prefectural museums
Art museums established in 2002
2002 establishments in Japan